Sapphire (born April 15, 1992) was a Holsteiner gelding who competed in Olympic show jumping, and 2003 Pan American Games gold medalist.

Career
On May 27, 2002 Sapphire won $35,000 Lexus of Glendale Memorial Grand Prix prize money, at the Memorial Day Classic Horse Show.  Sapphire bested a field of 25 starters with a double clear rounds and the fastest time in the jump off of 41.176 seconds. This win moved Sapphire into fourth place standing for American Grand Prix Association's "Horse of the Year", and Mark Watring "AGA (American Grand Prix Association) Rider".

Awards
2003, 2003 Pan American Games | Equestrian Individual Gold Medalist

Clone: “Saphir”
In 2008 Replica Farms, which represents Austin, TX-based ViaGen partnered with Sapphire's owners to produce a clone. Replica Farms, Inc. first produced clones of cutting horse Royal Blue Boon in 2005.

Successful cloning was completed in 2010. On February 11, 2010 the cloned foal was born in Amarillo, TX. The new colt is named “Saphir”.

See also
Show jumping
Holsteiner
Warmblood
Cloning
List of animals that have been cloned

References

External links
MarkWatringStables.com
ReplicaFarm.com
Viagen

1992 racehorse births
Horses in the Olympics
Individual male horses
Show jumping horses